Mansur Rahman (born October 31, 1954) is a Bangladesh Awami League politician and the incumbent Member of Parliament of Rajshahi-5.

Career
Rahman was elected to parliament from Rajshahi-5 as a Bangladesh Awami League candidate 30 December 2018.

References

Awami League politicians
Living people
11th Jatiya Sangsad members
Women members of the Jatiya Sangsad
Year of birth missing (living people)
21st-century Bangladeshi women politicians